Olaf Johannessen (14 May 1890 – 15 November 1977) was a Norwegian shooter who competed in the early 20th century in rifle shooting. He was born and died in Hamar. At the 1924 Summer Olympics he finished eighth in the free rifle team event, and also competed in the 600 metre free rifle and the 50 metre rifle, prone events.

References

1890 births
1977 deaths
ISSF rifle shooters
Norwegian male sport shooters
Shooters at the 1924 Summer Olympics
Olympic shooters of Norway
Sportspeople from Hamar
20th-century Norwegian people